Catterick Bridge railway station was a railway station in what is now the Richmondshire district of North Yorkshire,  England. It was built to serve the villages of Brompton-on-Swale and Catterick. The station was near the junction between the main branch line towards Richmond and a sub-branch line called Catterick Camp Military Railway to what is now Catterick Garrison.

History
The station was once part of the Eryholme-Richmond branch line, built by the York and Newcastle Railway in 1846. Like most of the infrastructure of the line, Catterick Bridge station was built in the Tudor Style.

On 4 February 1944, an ammunition train exploded in the station whist it was being loaded by four Army Privates. In all twelve people were killed in the explosion (including the four army Privates) with 102 being injured.

The Richmond branch line closed for passenger trains in 1969 but goods trains ran to Catterick Bridge until the following year.

Present
The station was demolished soon after the line it served was closed, although some evidence still remains. A caravan and motorhome dealer now occupy the site of the station.

References

Sources

External links
 Catterick Bridge, SubBrit disused stations project
 Catterick Bridge station on navigable 1947 O. S. map

Disused railway stations in North Yorkshire
Railway stations in Great Britain opened in 1846
Railway stations in Great Britain closed in 1969
1846 establishments in England
Former North Eastern Railway (UK) stations
Beeching closures in England